Sant'Agostino or Santagostino may refer to:

Film
Augustine: The Decline of the Roman Empire (Italian: Sant'Agostino)

Churches in Italy
Sant'Agostino, Cesena
Chiesa Parrocchiale di Sant'Agostino, Ferrara
Sant'Agostino (Genoa)
Sant'Agostino, Gubbio
Sant'Agostino, Lucca
Sant'Agostino, Massa Marittima
Sant'Agostino, Matelica
Sant'Agostino, Modena
Sant'Agostino, Montalcino
Sant'Agostino alla Zecca, Naples (Sant'Agostino Maggiore)
Sant'Agostino, Palermo
Sant'Agostino, Piacenza
Sant'Agostino, Prato
Sant'Agostino, Rimini
Basilica of Sant'Agostino, Rome
Sant'Agostino, San Gimignano
Sant'Agostino (Siena)

Other
Santagostino (surname)
Sant'Agostino (Milan Metro), a Milan Metro station
Sant'Agostino, Emilia–Romagna, a comune or town in Italy